Egret oil field also known as Egret Field is a complex oil and gas field in the South China Sea and 45 km north-west of Seria, Belait District, Brunei. It is located at the depth of 60 m, and operated by Brunei Shell Petroleum (BSP).

History 
The oil field was first discovered in 1971, but was deemed non-commercial. Moreover, it was predicted that the oil field would produce an estimated of 30 million barrels for 15-20 years. In order to supply the Brunei LNG plant in Lumut, a US$79 million development of the Egret field was planned by the BSP in November 2001 and 2002. The Phase 1 project was planned to be completed by August 2003, while Phase 2 was predicted to be in 2006. It was not until 2006, the extraction of oil and gas began. The EGDP-01 platform was put in the field and the gases would then be carried by pipelines to the Brunei LNG plant, via South West Ampa gas field.

Platforms 

 EGDP-01 (Main Complex Platform)

References 

Oil fields in Brunei
Peak oil
Belait District